Heterotermes is a genus of termites belonging to the family Rhinotermitidae.

The genus has almost cosmopolitan distribution.

General overview
Heterotermes is a termite genus from the Rhinotermitidae Family. One of their closest relatives is
Reticulitermes. And like its relative, some Heterotermes have also been considered pests because they
form pretty large colonies; to feed all their members, they need food in massive amounts. Therefore,
Heterotermes try to feed themselves by gathering cellulose food from dead tree logs, stumps, and
branches, to man-made wooden structures in buildings, books, paper, etc.

Heterotermes are also one of the most adaptive termites around, and they have a relatively fast growth
rate in mature colonies if they have the perfect conditions to thrive. They can be found in very dry areas
and also somewhat humid areas with plenty of wood. One of the other adaptations in Heterotermes is
the relatively fast Neotenic formation within the colony. Unlike Reticulitermes, who can form both
Ergatoid neotenic and Nymphoid neotenic reproductives, Heterotermes is only observed to have the
Nymphoid neotenic caste as a secondary reproductive.

Heterotermes are very similar looking to Reticulitermes. But this soldier caste in Heterotermes is smaller
than the soldier in Reticulitermes. And unlike Reticulitermes soldiers who have a curve in their mandible
which starts from the base of the mandible, Heterotermes soldiers have a mandible with a curved tip,
and the base area is straighter than Reticulitermes.

Castes
Primary reproductive
The alates of many Heterotermes and Reticulitermes are very similar in morphology. But many Heterotermes gynes are more lightly pigmented (color range is usually pale yellow-brown to orange-brown) than Reticulitermes. They are mainly around 7mm-11mm in length. A colony usually consists of a pair of Primary reproductive, but is occasionally found having a few pairs. 

Secondary reproductive
The only found type of secondary reproductive in Heterotermes is Nymphoid neotenic. They usually arise in case of colony isolation or the death of primary reproductive. They start to develop from around 3rd instar nymphs and but older nymphs are also found to molt back into a Nymphoid neotenic in case they are needed. A colony can have multiple Nymphoid neotenic pairs that get physogastric within the first few weeks to produce eggs. Similar to worker they lack visible eyes and are usually lightly pigmented giving a light orange-like tint. 

Workers and Soldiers
Workers build up the majority of a colony along with many soldiers. Workers perform tasks such as food gathering, nest expanding, care for reproductive and brood, while soldiers perform the task of defending intruders. The soldier will excrete a slightly grey-tinted sticky white liquid when disturbed and are also found to bump their heads into nest walls to alert fellow colony members about arriving danger.

Species
Heterotermes aethiopicus 
Heterotermes assu 
Heterotermes aureus 
Heterotermes balwanti 
Heterotermes brevicatena 
Heterotermes cardini 
Heterotermes ceylonicus 
Heterotermes convexinotatus 
Heterotermes crinitus 
Heterotermes eocenicus 
Heterotermes ferox 
Heterotermes gertrudae 
Heterotermes indicola 
Heterotermes intermedius 
Heterotermes longicatena 
Heterotermes longiceps 
Heterotermes maculatus 
Heterotermes malabaricus 
Heterotermes occiduus 
Heterotermes omanae 
Heterotermes pamatatensis 
Heterotermes paradoxus 
Heterotermes perfidus 
Heterotermes philippinensis 
Heterotermes platycephalus 
Heterotermes primaevus 
Heterotermes sulcatus 
Heterotermes tenuior 
Heterotermes tenuis 
Heterotermes vagus 
Heterotermes validus 
Heterotermes wittmeri

References

Rhinotermitidae